Arleta Meloch (born 17 August 1979) is a Paralympian athlete from Poland competing mainly in category T20 middle distance events. She is a two times Paralympic silver medalist and in 2011 at Christchurch she became the World Champion in the 1500m.

Notes

External links
 
 

Paralympic athletes of Poland
Athletes (track and field) at the 2000 Summer Paralympics
Athletes (track and field) at the 2012 Summer Paralympics
Paralympic silver medalists for Poland
Living people
Polish female middle-distance runners
Polish female long-distance runners
World record holders in Paralympic athletics
1979 births
People from Grudziądz
Medalists at the 2000 Summer Paralympics
Medalists at the 2012 Summer Paralympics
Sportspeople from Kuyavian-Pomeranian Voivodeship
Paralympic medalists in athletics (track and field)
20th-century Polish women
21st-century Polish women